The 1949 Columbia Lions football team was an American football team that represented Columbia University as an independent during the 1949 college football season. 

In their 20th season under head coach Lou Little, the Lions compiled a 2–7 record, and were outscored 276 to 82. Team captains Leon Van Bellingham and James Ward.  

Columbia played its home games at Baker Field in Upper Manhattan, in New York City.

Schedule

References

Columbia
Columbia Lions football seasons
Columbia Lions football